Phraya Manopakorn Nitithada (born Kon Hutasingha; 15 July 1884 – 1 October 1948) was the first Prime Minister of Siam after the Siamese Revolution of 1932 as he was selected by the leader of the People's Party – the party that instigated the revolution. However, in the following year, Manoparkorn was ousted by a coup in 1933 due to the conflicts between members of People's Party.

Early life

Kon Hutasingha was born on 15 July 1884 in Bangkok to Huad and Paew Hutasingha (Thai: นายฮวด กับนางแพ้ว หุตะสิงห์), both of whom were of Chinese extraction. He received his primary education at Suankularb Wittayalai School in Bangkok.  He pursued his law education at Assumption College and at the Law School of the Ministry of Justice. He then continued his studies abroad. It is claimed that he was a member at the Middle Temple,  in London,  England, but no evidence of his membership can be found in the Inn's admission registers. After he had finished his education, he began to work for the Ministry of Justice and climbed the traditional career ladder and was eventually granted the title Phraya and received his honorary name: "Manopakorn Nitithada". In 1918, he gained a seat in the Privy Council of King Vajiravudh (or Rama VI).

Revolution and premiership

Following the Revolution of 1932, King Prajadhipok (or Rama VII) consented to a Provisional Constitution on 27 June 1932. The first People's Assembly of Siam, composed entirely of appointed members, met for the first time on 28 June. The revolutionary Khana Ratsadon Party, not wanting to appear as if it had instigated the revolution for self-aggrandizement, chose Phraya Manopakorn as President of the Committee. He was considered a largely neutral and clean figure, but at the same time respected enough to take the position.

As a result, the Assembly with the advice of Pridi Panomyong, one of the leaders of the Khana Ratsadon offered Manopakorn the post of "President of the People's Committee", an early version of the post of Prime Minister.

The first mission of Phraya Manopakorn's Cabinet was to draft a permanent constitution. King Prajadhipok made an observation that the term "President of the People's Committee" sounded like a communist or republican post. After a debate, the office was eventually changed to "prime minister". The first constitution of Siam was promulgated under Phraya Manopakorn's watch on 10 December 1932, now celebrated as the Thai Constitution Day.

Soon after, Phraya Manopakorn became the head of the first constitutional government of Siam. The Manopakorn cabinet, or People's Committee, composed of members, half from the People's Party and half from senior civil servants and military officers, was appointed under the guidance of the party. Phraya Manopakorn in essence became the Khana Ratsadon's puppet, and the country a single-party state.

Yellow Cover Dossier incident and Coup
In 1933, Pridi Panomyong, by then a Minister of State, presented his Draft Economic Plan or Yellow Cover Dossier to King Prajadhipok. The dossier was an economic plan, which advocated socialist solutions to the country's many financial and economic problems. Prajadhipok even branded the dossier "communist" and attacked Pridi publicly about it. When Pridi's dossier was rejected, his status fell and caused a major disruption among the members of People's Party and the People's Committee itself.

Phraya Mano rallied those who opposed the socialist plan of Pridi including Phraya Songsuradet and dissolved his own cabinet to oust Pridi, who had great support within the People's Party. To regain some stability and silence domestic critics, Phraya Manopakorn had some articles in the constitution suspended. Manopakorn barred the People's Assembly from any further meetings and the judiciary was shut down. Pridi was forced to flee to France. It was said that Manopakorn "led the coup with his pen", this event is known in Thailand as the "April 1933 Coup" (or the "Silent Coup") (Thai: รัฐประหารในประเทศไทย เมษายน พ.ศ. 2476). Phraya Manopakorn then approved the Anti-Communist Act, which empowered him to arrest those suspected of having communist sentiments: the entire Central Committee of the Communist Party of Siam was arrested and imprisoned.

After the Yellow Dossier Incident, the degree of political freedom was greatly reduced by Phraya Manopakorn's policies. He censored many leftist activities including shutting down newspapers and publications. However the People's Party, which gave him the premiership, would eventually be his downfall. On 16 June, Phraya Pahol Polpayuhasena, the country's most powerful military leader and member of the People's Party, together with three other senior officers retired from the People's Committee, for "health reasons".

Death and legacy

The 1933 Siamese coup d'état happened on 20 June, led by Phraya Pahol and other military leaders. Phraya Manopakorn was immediately removed as prime minister. Phraya Phahol appointed himself the country's second prime minister and took over the government. King Pradhipok duly accepted his appointment. Manopakorn was then exiled to Penang, British Malaya, and lived there until his death in 1948, aged 64.

Phraya Manopakorn was Siam's first prime minister and the first to be ousted by a coup. He would not be the last civilian prime minister to be ousted by a military coup. His legacy is mixed: on the one hand he took over the reins of government at a difficult time (Wall Street Crash of 1929), but on the other he exceeded his powers and was not able to counter the powers of the Khana Ratsadon which became increasingly dictatorial.

See also
 List of prime ministers of Thailand
 1932 Siamese coup d'état
 Siamese coup d'état of 1933
 People's Committee of Siam

References

Bibliography
 Paul Preston, Michael Partridge, Antony Best, British Documents on Foreign Affairs--Reports and Papers from the Foreign Office Confidential Print, Volume 6, University Publications of America, 1997, 

Prime Ministers of Thailand
Ministers of Finance of Thailand
Recipients of the Dushdi Mala Medal, Pin of Arts and Science
Members of the Middle Temple
Alumni of Assumption College (Thailand)
Thai politicians of Chinese descent
Thai leaders who took power by coup
Leaders ousted by a coup
Phraya
People from Bangkok
Members of the Privy Council of Thailand
1884 births
1948 deaths